Paul Francis Duffy, OMI (July 25, 1932 – August 23, 2011) was the first Catholic bishop of the Diocese of Mongu, Zambia.

Born in Norwood, Massachusetts, United States, Duffy was ordained to the priesthood in 1962.  He joined the Missionary Oblates of Mary Immaculate in the USA in 1952 and was ordained priest on 22 December 1962.

He left for Zambia in 1982, working in Lukulu and Kalabo. In 1997, Duffy was appointed bishop of the Mongu Diocese, retiring in 2011. He died later that year in San Antonio Texas, USA, suffering from leukaemia.

Notes

People from Norwood, Massachusetts
20th-century Roman Catholic bishops in Zambia
1932 births
2011 deaths
Catholics from Massachusetts
21st-century Roman Catholic bishops in Zambia
Roman Catholic bishops of Mongu
American expatriates in Zambia
Missionary Oblates of Mary Immaculate
American expatriate bishops
20th-century American Roman Catholic priests
21st-century American Roman Catholic priests